Sydney Baldwin (born January 15, 1996) is an American ice hockey defender, who plays for the Minnesota Whitecaps of the Premier Hockey Federation (PHF).

Playing career 
In 2014, Baldwin received the Minnesota Ms. Hockey Award and was named the Star Tribune Metro Player of the Year.

Across 151 games with the Golden Gophers women's ice hockey program of the University of Minnesota, Baldwin put up 81 points. In 2018, she was named a finalist for the Patty Kazmaier Memorial Award.

After graduating, she signed with EHV Sabres Wien of the European Women's Hockey League (EWHL). Putting up 19 points in 10 games, she was named to the EWHL All-Star Team.

On the September 3, 2019, Baldwin signed with the Minnesota Whitecaps of the National Women's Hockey League (NWHL; rebranded as PHF in 2021). After scoring 18 points in 17 games in her rookie season, she was named to the 2020 NWHL All-Star Game, but was ultimately unable to participate.

International 
Baldwin represented the United States at the IIHF U18 Women's World Championships in 2013 and 2014, winning a silver medal both times. In 2014, she served as an alternate captain.

Personal life
Baldwin holds a bachelor’s degree in health services management and human resources development from the University of Minnesota and a MSc in nursing from St. Catherine University. During her graduate studies at St. Catherine University, she served as an assistant coach to the St. Catherine Wildcats women's ice hockey program in the Minnesota Intercollegiate Athletic Conference (MIAC) of the NCAA Division III.

References

External links
 

1996 births
Living people
American expatriate ice hockey players in Austria
American women's ice hockey defensemen
Ice hockey players from Minnesota
Minnesota Whitecaps players
People from Minnetonka, Minnesota
21st-century American women
European Women's Hockey League players